Thyagu  (born 5 February 1958) is an Indian actor and comedian who appears in Tamil films. He is the grandson of violinist Kumbakonam Rajamanickam Pillai.

Career
Beginning as a protagonist, Thyagu played roles in Oru Thalai Ragam and Palaivana Solai, before playing antagonistic roles in the late 1980s and early 1990s. In the 2000s, he often formed an association with Vadivelu and would appear in a few scenes in films he had signed for, occasionally portraying comedy roles. His recent work includes roles in Kuselan as well as a politician in the Singam series.

In 2011, Thyagu quit the DMK political party, whom he had been associated with for twenty-eight years. Soon after his split, he lamented the leader Karunanidhi's broken promise of honouring Thyagu's grandfather with a postage stamp as a reason of his departure.

Selected filmography

References

External links
 

Living people
Tamil comedians
Male actors from Tamil Nadu
Male actors in Tamil cinema
1950 births
People from Thanjavur district
Indian male comedians
Tamil male actors
20th-century Indian male actors
21st-century Indian male actors